The Penguin King (US title: Penguins 3D) is a British 2012 natural history documentary which follows the life of a male king penguin on South Georgia. Released in 3D and 2D, The Penguin King is the second collaboration between Sky, Atlantic Productions and David Attenborough, who wrote and narrated the film. It was preceded by Flying Monsters 3D, screened a year earlier, and was followed by the three-part series Kingdom of Plants 3D in spring 2012. The film features a music score from UK composer James Edward Barker.

A new version of the film, Adventures of the Penguin King, was released in December 2013.

References

External links
 
 The Penguin King at Atlantic Productions

Documentary films about birds
Fauna of South Georgia
3D documentary films
2010s English-language films